Newtown School is a multidenominational, coeducational independent school with both day and boarding pupils in Waterford, Ireland. It is run by a Board of Management, but owned by the Religious Society of Friends.

History 
Newtown School was founded in 1798 by the Religious Society of Friends (Quaker), on the estates of the former home of Sir Thomas Wyse. Its original purpose was the education of Quakers in the south of Ireland, and until 1858 no non-Quakers were admitted, although priority is still given to applicants who are Quakers.
In 1924 Newtown adopted a fully coeducational policy which it has maintained to the present day.

Newtown School is a co-educational boarding and day school. Boarding facilities are offered on a three-weekly basis. Some students may opt for weekly boarding. There are two residences, for girls and boys separately. Accommodation is mostly in dorms but there are also twin and single rooms. Day students have the opportunity to become day boarders and remain in school until after evening study thus allowing them to take a full part in all aspects of school life.

Curriculum

Junior cycle 
For the Junior Cycle, Newtown follows the curriculum for the Junior Certificate. All offered subjects offered are available in Higher and Ordinary levels. First Year Scholars have access to twenty-one subjects. In Second and Third Year, all Junior Certificate candidates study Art, Craft & Design and Science, all have access to French and/or German and:or Spanish and all take a practical subject, either Materials Technology (woodwork) or Home Economics, Technical graphics , business studies or music.

Transition year 
Newtown operates a compulsory Transition Year program. In recent years students have participated in kayaking, outdoor pursuits, Young Social Innovators, surfing, lifesaving courses, drama, media, personal development, nutrition, enterprise, crafts and fashion design. The programme also includes week-long work experience placements, and a European studies tour on themes pertinent to the programme, along with other courses that vary from year to year.

Senior cycle 
The senior cycle begins at the end of Transition Year when students are asked to choose the subjects in which they would like to be examined at Leaving Certificate, in order of preference. The subjects offered in addition to the three compulsory subjects (English, Maths and Irish) vary each year, depending on demand(e.g. Applied Mathematics). At present there are over 20 Leaving Certificate subjects offered, all of which are available for study at any level.

Sports Facilities 
Newtown has a 25m indoor swimming pool (with diving platforms and a diving board), a gym, a weights-room, an astroturf hockey pitch, an athletics track, two hockey training pitches, two rugby pitches, a cricket lawn and tennis courts. A cross-country track also runs along the perimeter of the  grounds.

Notable alumni 

Erskine Barton Childers – writer, journalist, United Nations civil servant
Jeamie Deacon – rugby union and field hockey player
Ralph Fiennes – actor
R. F. Foster – historian of the Modern Irish period
Ian Gibson – historian, author and Hispanist
Sinéad O'Connor – singer
Nick Popplewell – rugby union player
Philip Boucher-Hayes – journalist
[[Phill Jolly]- Upper Class

References

External links

 Newtown School official website
 Newtown School Waterford, Mountmellick & Foy Old Scholars Association
 History of Irish Quaker schools

Buildings and structures in Waterford (city)
Education in Waterford (city)
Quaker schools
Secondary schools in County Waterford
Educational institutions established in 1798
Boarding schools in Ireland
Private schools in the Republic of Ireland
Protestant schools in the Republic of Ireland
Co-educational boarding schools
1798 establishments in Ireland